Shades of Love is a solo album by vibraphonist Walt Dickerson performing on two vibraphones which was recorded direct to disc in 1977 for the SteepleChase label.

Reception

Allmusic gave the album 3 stars.

Track listing
All compositions by Walt Dickerson.
 "Infinite Love" – 13:41
 "Love Is You" – 4:15
 "Interim Love" – 5:17
 "Infinite Love" [Take 2] – 4:30 Bonus track on CD reissue

Personnel 
Walt Dickerson – vibraphone

References 

1978 albums
Walt Dickerson albums
SteepleChase Records albums